Bangladesh Planning Commission (denoted as PC) is the economic public policy institution of the Government of Bangladesh. The Planning Commission undertakes research studies and policy development initiatives for the growth of national economy and the expansion of the public infrastructure of the country, in tandem under the Ministry of Planning and alongside the Ministry of Finance.

In addition, the planning division of the Planning Commission serves as the secretariat for all major economic policy questions and for initiating the appraisal of development projects and programmes by: 
 National Economic Council (NEC)
 Executive Committee of the National Economic Council (ECNEC)

National Economic Council (NEC)
The National Economic Council is the highest political authority for the consideration of economic policies and development activities reflective of long-term national policy objectives of the government of Bangladesh. It serves as the economic "mini-cabinet", consisting of the main economic ministers and their officials, and is chaired by the Prime Minister.

Generally, the ministries formulate their respective plans and programmes or projects, as per objectives formulated by the NEC. The NEC meets when called by the prime minister, and meetings can include external invitees dependent on the subject under consideration. All NEC proposals are later provided to ECNEC to be approved.

Structure
 Prime Minister of Bangladesh (Chairperson)
 Cabinet Ministers (as Members) who have economic portfolios

Supporting officials
 Cabinet Secretary
 Governor, Bangladesh Bank
 All Members, Planning Commission
 Secretary, Concerned Ministry/Divisions

Functions of the NEC
 To provide overall guidance of the formulation of Five Year Plans and the Annual Development Programme
 To finalise and approve economic plans, programmes and policies
 To review progress of implementation of development programme
 To take such others decisions and actions as may be considered necessary for socio- economic development.
 To appoint sub-committees as deemed fit to assist the NEC to discharge specific responsibilities
Evaluation  impact analysis of project, programmes and plans on the national living standard

Meetings
 Meeting of NEC is held every month, and can be held earlier if required by the prime minister (who is the chair)
Planning Division provides secretariat to the NEC

Executive Committee of the National Economic Council (ECNEC)
The ECNEC Wing of the Planning Commission is in charge of co-ordinating meetings of the ECNEC, and monitoring the implementation of decisions taken at the meetings.

ECNEC Wing is headed by a Joint Secretary of the Bangladesh Civil Service (Administration) cadre, who is supported by two Deputy Secretaries and two Senior Assistant Secretaries.

Structure
 Prime Minister, Chairperson 
 Minister, Ministry of Finance, Alternate Chairperson
 Minister, Ministry of Labour and Employment
 Minister, Ministry of Water Resources
 Minister, Ministry of Commerce
 Minister, Ministry of Communication of Bangladesh 
 Minister, Ministry of Shipping
 Minister/State Minister of the concerned Ministry

Supporting officials
 Cabinet Secretary of Bangladesh
 Principal Secretary or Secretary, Prime Minister's Office
 Secretary, Economic Relations Division
 Secretary, Finance Division
 Secretary, Planning Division
 Secretary, IMED
 Member, General Economics Division, Planning Commission
 Member, Programming, Planning Commission
 Secretary, Concerned Ministry/Division

Functions of the ECNEC
The primary functions of the ECNEC Wing are the following:
to call meetings among members of NEC, ECNEC and other relevant officials
prepare the agenda and minutes of meetings, distribute, and publish them across government for action
monitor decisions taken at the meetings for implementation

Meetings
To consider and approve yearly target of foreign aid bids, expansion of trade, export of manpower as well as to review the progress of other annual targets.
 Meeting of ECNEC is held as and when required by Chairperson
 Planning Division provides secretariat to the ECNEC

See also
 Economy of Bangladesh

References

External links
 National Economic Council in Banglapedia
 National Economic Council in Planning Commission site.

Economy of Bangladesh
Economic planning
Government agencies of Bangladesh
Government commissions of Bangladesh